Layfields Run is a stream in the U.S. state of West Virginia.

Layfields Run was named after William Layfield, an early settler.

See also
List of rivers of West Virginia

References

Rivers of Ritchie County, West Virginia
Rivers of West Virginia